The Syre or Syr is a river flowing through Luxembourg, joining the Moselle in Mertert. It flows through Schuttrange, Roodt-sur-Syre, Betzdorf and Manternach.

Rivers of Luxembourg